The Skeena Country is a historic geographic region comprising areas of both the British Columbia Coast and the British Columbia Interior in northwestern British Columbia, Canada.

See also 

 Skeena Crossing
 Skeena Mountains
 Skeena River
 Skeena—Bulkley Valley, federal electoral district
 Skeena, former federal electoral district

External links